Eitan Ginzburg (born 25 January 1977) is an Israeli politician. The first openly gay mayor in Israel when he became mayor of Ra'anana in 2018, he was elected to the Knesset the following year and was formerly Minister of Communications.

Biography
Ginzburg was born in La Plata in Argentina. When he was eighteen months old, his family emigrated to Israel, initially settling in kibbutz Or HaNer, before moving to Ra'anana when he was aged ten. After being educated at Ostrovsky high school, he carried out his national service in the Israel Defense Forces in the Military Police Corps, reaching the rank of major by the time of  his discharge in 1999.

Ginzburg went on to earn an LLB and a BA in government at the Interdisciplinary Center Herzliya and an MA in political science at Tel Aviv University. In the early 2000s he was amongst the founders of the Yisrael Aheret party, and he was second on its list for the 2003 Knesset elections, but the party failed to win a seat. However, in the municipal elections later in the year, he became the youngest-ever person elected to Ra'anana city council when he was elected on the Independent List for Ra'anana headed by Ze'ev Bielski. Between 2007 and 2008 he was an advisor to Deputy Minister of Defence Matan Vilnai.

In the 2008 municipal elections he headed the Labor Party list in the city, and was re-elected for another term. From 2010 he served as deputy and acting mayor. He switched back to Bielski's list for the 2013 elections. When Bielski resigned as mayor in March 2018, Ginzburg was elected by city councillors to serve as his replacement until the October 2018 elections, becoming the country's first openly gay mayor. However, the October elections saw him lose to Haim Broide in the second round with 41.74% of the vote.

In 2019 Ginzburg joined the new Israel Resilience Party. After the party became part of the Blue and White alliance, he was given the thirty-second slot on the joint list, and was subsequently elected to the Knesset as the alliance won 35 seats. In May 2021 he was appointed Minister of Communications.

References

External links

1977 births
Living people
People from La Plata
Argentine emigrants to Israel
Argentine Jews
Blue and White (political alliance) politicians
Deputy Speakers of the Knesset
Reichman University alumni
Israel Resilience Party politicians
Israeli Jews
Israeli Labor Party politicians
Israeli people of Argentine-Jewish descent
Jewish Israeli politicians
LGBT mayors
LGBT members of the Knesset
Mayors of Ra'anana
Members of the 21st Knesset (2019)
Members of the 22nd Knesset (2019–2020)
Members of the 23rd Knesset (2020–2021)
Members of the 24th Knesset (2021–2022)
Ministers of Communications of Israel
Tel Aviv University alumni
LGBT Jews
21st-century LGBT people